Behram Zülaloğlu (born 30 August 1982) is a Turkish professional football coach and a former goalkeeper. He works as a goalkeeping coach for İstanbul Başakşehir.

References

External links
 
 

1982 births
Living people
Turkish footballers
Association football goalkeepers
MKE Ankaragücü footballers
İstanbulspor footballers
Kocaelispor footballers
İstanbul Başakşehir F.K. players
Süper Lig players
TFF First League players
TFF Second League players
TFF Third League players